In metadata, the term date is a representation term used to specify a calendar date in the Gregorian calendar.  Many data representation standards such as XML, XML Schema,  Web Ontology Language specify that ISO date format ISO 8601 should be used.

Note that Date should not be confused with the DateAndTime representation term which requires that both the date and time to be supplied.

Metadata registries that use the date representation term
 NIEM
 ebXML
 GJXDM

See also
 metadata
 ISO/IEC 11179
 Representation term
 ISO 8601

Metadata
Representation term